Dasyphora is a genus from the fly family Muscidae. There are currently 1,148 recorded instances of this fly by human observation, material sample, preserved specimen, or unknown source. The majority of these records are in northern North America and Europe.

Species List 
D. affricana
D. albofasciata (Macquart, 1839)
D. apicotaeniata
D. asiatica
D. canadiana
D. cordilleriana
D. cyanella
D. cyanicolor
D. gansuensis
D. gussakovskii
D. himalayensis
D. huilensis
D. kempi
D. latifrons
D. meriodionalis
D. paraversicolor
D. penicillata (Egger, 1865)
D. pratorum (Meigen, 1826)
D. qinghaiensis
D. setitiba
D. similis
D. sinensis
D. stackelbergiana
D. tianshanensis
D. trichosterna

References

Muscidae genera
Taxa named by Jean-Baptiste Robineau-Desvoidy